Hemvati Nandan Bahuguna Garhwal University (HNBGU) (formerly known as Garhwal University) is a Central University, established in 1973, located in Srinagar in the Pauri Garhwal district of Uttarakhand in Northern India. The university is named after Hemvati Nandan Bahuguna, former Chief Minister of Uttar Pradesh. The university is residential cum affiliating with jurisdiction over Garhwal region. It is on the banks of the river Alaknanda in the mid-Himalayas. University intake is through examination including Joint Entrance Examination – Main (JEE Main) for School of Engineering & Technology, CAT and MAT. The university is A Graded with CGPA of 3.11 by the National Assessment and Accreditation Council (NAAC).

History 

The university was established in November 1973. It was renamed Hemvati Nandan Bahuguna Garhwal University in 1989 in commemoration of the memory of a leading statesman Hemvati Nandan Bahuguna. In 2009, Garhwal University was declared a Central University pursuant to the Central Universities Act.

Campus 
The university is a residential cum affiliating institution of higher learning. It has jurisdiction over seven districts of Garhwal region of Uttarakhand. Its headquarters are at Srinagar, from Rishikesh along the Delhi-Mana National Highway. The university has three campuses:  Birla Campus, Srinagar Garhwal with its extension at Chauras Campus, B. Gopal Reddy Campus, Pauri and Swami Ram Teerth (SRT) Campus, Badshahithaul, Tehri. In addition, there are 121 colleges and institutes affiliated to it, spreading over seven districts of Garhwal region of Uttarakhand. The university offers undergraduate, post-graduate and research programmes in several various disciplines. Besides conventional courses under different streams of studies, the University has introduced some regionally relevant courses that are of greater significance for the mountainous areas.

 Birla Campus – located at Srinagar (Garhwal) bisected into the Main Campus and the Chauras Campus by river Alaknanda. These campuses are apart. 

Organisation and administration

Schools 
School of Agriculture and Allied Sciences
School of Sciences
School of Commerce
School of Earth Sciences
School of Education
School of Engineering and Technology
School of Arts, Communication and Languages
School of Humanities and Social Sciences
School of Law
School of Life Sciences
School of Management

Facilities

Research facility 
University Science Instrument Centre provides research facilities for research-oriented students.

Central facilities 
Central Library
Computer Centre
University Sports Board
Guest House
University dispencery 
University Science Instrument Centre
University Career Counseling and Placement Service
Women Cell for "Combating Sexual Harassment" and Creation of Healthy Environment in University

Other facilities 
Auditorium
IT Infrastructure
Sports
Cafeteria
Medical/Hospital 
Wireless fidelity (WiFi)
Alumni Associations
Boy's Hostel 
Girl's Hostel
Transport

Self-financed affiliated institute 
Baba Farid Institute of Technology
Himalayan Institute of Technology

Student life

Students' Union
The Student Apex Body is the group of student leaders presiding over all the student unions of the colleges that are affiliated to HNB Garhwal University. The members of the apex body are elected by an indirect election amongst the university representatives coming from each college. There are about 161 colleges affiliated to HNB Garhwal University.

Notable alumni 

Chandrashekhar Azad Ravan, Founder Bhim Army & National President Azad Samaj Party.
Dhan Singh Negi, Former MLA for Tehri
Ramesh Pokhriyal Nishank, Former Union Education Minister.
Yogi Adityanath (former name: Ajay Mohan Bisht), Chief Minister of Uttar Pradesh.
Tirath Singh Rawat, Former Chief Minister of Uttarakhand.
Trivendra Singh Rawat, Former Chief Minister of Uttarakhand.
Dhan Singh Rawat, Higher Education Minister, Govt. of Uttarakhand. 
Raghav Juyal, Indian Dancer, Choreographer, and Actor.
Shankar (actor), Indian film actor
 Mahipal Singh Rawat, Secretary, HNB Garhwal University Alumni Association,  Business Head - Jetfleet, New Delhi).
Anshul Jubli, UFC fighter.

References

External links 

Central universities in India
 
Pauri Garhwal district
Educational institutions established in 1973
1973 establishments in Uttar Pradesh
Universities in Uttarakhand